Johannes Fabri may refer to:
Johann Fabri (printer) (died 1496), German and Swedish printer
Johannes Fabri (bishop of Osnabrück), 15th century German Roman Catholic bishop 
Johannes Fabri (bishop of Paderborn) (died 1458), German Roman Catholic bishop
 (died 1480), German Roman Catholic theologian
Johann Faber (1478-1541), Catholic theologian known for his anti-Protestant writings
Johann Faber of Heilbronn (1504–1558), German preacher